Martinson's Beach is a hamlet in the Canadian province of Saskatchewan. It is located on the western shore of Jackfish Lake.

Demographics 

References

Designated places in Saskatchewan
Meota No. 468, Saskatchewan
Organized hamlets in Saskatchewan